Cedar Creek is a locality split between City of Gold Coast and Logan City in Queensland, Australia.

Geography 

The Beaudesert–Beenleigh Road runs through from south to north.

History
The first European settler in the district was Jessie Daniells who established a timber mill in the area in 1864. Most of the early farmers in the district grew sugar cane. David Veivers established a dairy in the 1870s.

Cedar Creek Wesleyan Methodist Church was established in 1871 on the property of Mr Bowser at the junction of Cedar Creek and Albert River. It was not listed as an active church in 1882 and has been demolished.

William Fowles became the headmaster in 1875. In 1888, it became Cedar Creek State School, but low student numbers reduced it to Cedar Creek Provisional School in 1892. In 1895, it became Cedar Creek State School again. In 1913,  of land were given up to be used for a School of Arts. The diamond jubilee celebrations were held in December 1934 and were attended by Members of the Queensland Legislative Assembly, Reginald King (Member for Logan) and Thomas Flood Plunkett (Member for Albert). At that time there were less than 25 students. In 2014, there are about 240 students enrolled.

The Cedar Creek School of Arts was erected in December 1913 by the Upper Albert branch of the Farmers' Union.

Formerly in the Shire of Beaudesert, Cedar Creek became split between Logan City and City of Gold Coast following the local government amalgamations in March 2008.  Parts of Cedar Creek were to be taken up by the waters of the proposed but never completed Wolffdene Dam.

The median age of the Cedar Creek population was 38 years, 1 year above the national median of 37.  76.9% of people living in Cedar Creek were born in Australia. The other top responses for country of birth were England 8.2%, New Zealand 2%, South Africa 1.6%, Burma 0.6%, Czech Republic 0.5%  92.4% of people spoke only English at home; the next most common languages were 0.8% Polish, 0.6% Japanese, 0.5% Russian, 0.5% Portuguese, 0.5% Hungarian. 

Education 

Cedar Creek State School is a government primary (Prep-6) school for boys and girls at 1a Chardon Bridge Road. In 2018, the school had an enrolment of 230 students with 19 teachers (17 full-time equivalent) and 18 non-teaching staff (10 full-time equivalent). It includes a special education program.

There is no secondary school in Cedar Creek. The nearest government secondary schools are Windaroo Valley State High School in Bahrs Scrub to the north and Tamborine Mountain State High School in neighbouring Tamborine Mountain to the south.

Facilities 

Parkhouse Cemetery is on Veivers Road.

Amenities 
Cedar Creek Hall is on the corner of Beenleigh-Beaudesert Road and Chardon Bridge Road.

The Gold Coast City Council operates a fortnightly mobile library service which visits Cedar Creek State School on Beenleigh-Beaudesert Road.

There are a number of parks in the locality, including:

 Cedar Creek Conservation Area
 Cedar Creek Parklands

 Chardon Bridge Park

 Howard Creek Reserve

 Little Cedar Creek Reserve

 Lower Cedar Creek Parklands
 Plunkett Road Park

 Rocky Creek Conservation Area

 Rowe Reserve

 Schmidt Road Parklands

 Tamaree Reserve

 Tamborine Oxenford Rd Bend Reserve

 Tamborine Recreation Reserve

 Upper Ormeau Conservation Area

References

External links

 

Suburbs of the Gold Coast, Queensland
Localities in Queensland
Suburbs of Logan City